Amirali Alibhai "Amir" Bhatia, Baron Bhatia,  (born 18 March 1932) is a British businessman and politician.

Background 
An Ismaili Muslim born in East Africa, Bhatia was educated in schools in Tanzania and India. He is married to Nurbanu Amersi and has three daughters. He moved to the United Kingdom in 1972.

Career 
Bhatia was chairman and managing director of Forbes Campbell International Ltd between 1980 and 2001. He was the co-founder of the Ethnic Minority Foundation and its chair until 2009, and also helped establish the Council of Ethnic Minority Voluntary Sector Organisations (CEMVO). He is additionally a former trustee of various charitable organisations, including the National Lottery Charities Board and Oxfam, serving as chairman of Oxfam Trading.

In 2006 he was the chair of the British Edutrust foundation, the organisation planning to sponsor Rhodesway School. He stepped down from the post in March 2009.

Honours 
Bhatia was appointed an Officer of the Order of the British Empire (OBE) in the 1997 Birthday Honours. On 5 June 2001, he was created a life peer as Baron Bhatia, of Hampton in the London Borough of Richmond upon Thames, one of the first 'people's peers'. He took his seat in the House of Lords as a crossbencher.

In 2003 Lord Bhatia received the Beacon Fellowship Prize for his leadership role in countering social deprivation and exclusion in the UK and internationally.

Controversy 
In October 2010, Lord Bhatia was suspended from the House of Lords for eight months due to the United Kingdom parliamentary expenses scandal. After that, he has sat in the Lords as a non-affiliated member.

In December 2013, BBC Newsnight reported that Lord Bhatia had been accused by the Ethnic Minority Foundation of misappropriating £600,000 from the charity. Lord Bhatia was suing the charity for unfair dismissal, and his lawyers said that the allegations were confusing the historical position with the present dispute.

References

External links 
Millionaire Lord Bhatia claimed £20,000 on small flat
 Expenses: Baroness Uddin, Lord Bhatia, Lord Paul ordered to repay £200,000
 Conduct of Lord Bhatia, Lord Paul and Baroness Uddin

1932 births
Living people
British businesspeople
Crossbench life peers
People's peers
Officers of the Order of the British Empire
British politicians of Indian descent
Tanzanian emigrants to the United Kingdom
British Ismailis
British people of Indian descent
British people of Gujarati descent
Khoja Ismailism
Life peers created by Elizabeth II